The Survey of India Service (SIS) is a cadre of the Government of India who prepare the Survey of India.
In India, topographical map is published by the Survey of India.

Description
The members of this service are responsible for the planning and execution of engineering surveys and meeting the mapping needs of the country. Direct appointment to the service is made on the basis of a competitive examination. An Engineering Services Examination is conducted by the Union Public Service Commission every year. Only candidates having a Bachelor's degree in Engineering are eligible to take the examination. All the Group 'A' Posts of the service are Civil Engineering Posts or Electronics and Telecommunication Engineering posts. The streams have thus respectively been designated as SIS (Civil) and SIS (Electronics). The Direct Entry level Group 'A' post on the basis of Engineering Services Examination is the Deputy Superintending Surveyor. The candidates recommended for appointment to the service are initially trained at the Indian Institute of Surveying & Mapping at Uppal, Hyderabad, Telangana.

References

External links
 Official website of the Survey of India
 Official website of the Survey Training Institute at Uppal, Hyderabad

Civil Services of India
Surveying of India